Priest, in comics, may refer to:

 Christopher Priest (comics), the nom de plume of an American comics writer, often credited as "Priest"
 Priest, a dark fantasy horror comic series
 Jessica Priest, a character from Spawn
 Priest (DC Comics), a DC Comics character who has appeared in a number of Green Lantern stories
 Priest, a 1996 series from Maximum Press

See also
Priest (disambiguation)

References